Staré Sedliště is a municipality and village in Tachov District in the Plzeň Region of the Czech Republic. It has about 1,200 inhabitants.

Administrative parts
Villages of Labuť, Mchov, Nové Sedliště and Úšava are administrative parts of Staré Sedliště.

Notable people
Ernst Schmutzer (1930–2022), German theoretical physicist

References

Villages in Tachov District